, often called , is a Japanese singer, songwriter, actor, voice actor, presenter and radio host. He is a member of the Japanese idol group Arashi.

His career began in the entertainment industry after joining the Japanese talent agency Johnny & Associates in 1996 aged 13. Prior to his debut as a member of Arashi, Ninomiya started an acting career when he was cast as Chris for the stage play Stand by Me, which was based on the film of the same name.

Apart from his group's activities, he starred in numerous television drama, movie and stage production, and has been regarded as the actor of Arashi. Described as an actor who can act with his mouth and eyes, Ninomiya has won a number of awards and nominations for his roles.

Early life 
Ninomiya was born in Katsushika, Tokyo as the youngest child of his family. His father and mother were both working as chefs when they met and his sister is two years older than he is. When Ninomiya was born, his grandfather immediately came home and named him the heir to the family's windshield wiper factory since he was his grandfather's only grandson. However, when Ninomiya was twelve years old, his cousin sent in an application to Johnny & Associates without his knowledge. After attending and passing the auditions due to his mother's prodding, he joined the talent agency.

Ninomiya graduated from high school in March 2002 at the age of 18.

Music career 

In 2004, Ninomiya penned and composed  for his solo performance during Arashi's Iza, Now!! tour. Although Arashi's fifth studio album One was the first of their albums to feature solo songs of each member, Ninomiya did not provide lyrics or music for official release until the Time album almost two years later.

In 2007, the group's eighteenth single "Love So Sweet" was released with the limited edition containing the bonus song , which was written by Arashi and composed by Ninomiya in 2006 for their variety show G no Arashi. On July 11, 2007, the Time album was released with the limited edition containing solo song of each member. Ninomiya wrote the lyrics to his solo song, and played the piano portion of the song throughout Arashi's summer tour. He later reprised the performance throughout Arashi's second Asia Tour in 2008.

In 2008, Ninomiya composed, co-arranged and penned the lyrics for his solo "Gimmick Game". In 2010, Ninomiya also composed, co-arranged and penned the lyrics for his solo "1992*4##111".

During Arashi's hiatus, Ninomiya released, in 2022, a solo album with his choice of cover songs, on June 17, in CD (+DVD/BR) for the members of Arashi's Fan Club, and June 20, in digital download and streaming. With this, he became the second member, after Satoshi Ohno, to release a solo work. The album, Marumaru to Ninomiya to (〇〇と二宮と), debuted at the top spot on the Oricon download ranking within a week of its release.

Acting career

Stage 
Ninomiya began his acting career in a 1997 stage play based on the American coming of age film Stand by Me with future bandmates Masaki Aiba and Jun Matsumoto. He did not return to do any major stage productions for nearly seven years after Stand by Me, instead focusing on dramas. However, in 2004, Ninomiya appeared in his first lead role in the stage play  directed by Yukio Ninagawa. From April 3, 2005 to May 4, 2005, he took up Rebel Without a Cause, playing the James Dean character Jim Stark.

From July 18, 2009 to August 11, 2009, Ninomiya appeared in his first stage play in four years.

Drama 
In 1998, he made his television debut as a fifteen-year-old runaway in the TBS television movie . Just a few months before his debut with Arashi, he was given his first lead role in the drama  with Subaru Shibutani acting as his stepbrother. His schedule became packed, causing him to lose 7 kg in a month as a result. From October 11, 1999 to October 29, 1999, because Arashi were the main supporters for the 8th World Cup of Volleyball Championships, all five members co-starred together for the first time in the volleyball-centered short drama .

From 2003 to 2005, Ninomiya continued to appear in a wide range of dramas. He played a student who found himself to be one of the last four virgins left at school in the comedy series Stand Up!!, a boyfriend of a girl who mysteriously shrunk into a size of merely sixteen centimeters tall in the romance series  and a young man who accidentally killed his mother and developed an estranged relationship with his father as a result in the human drama series 

In 2006, Ninomiya starred in the drama special , which was based on the true story of young man diagnosed with Ewing's sarcoma. He went on to appear in two different films for the rest of 2006 before taking up  on January 11, 2007.

During the summer of 2007, he and fellow Arashi bandmate Sho Sakurai co-starred together in the manga-based comedy drama Yamada Tarō Monogatari. Ninomiya played the title character , an extremely poor student attending a school for the rich. Soon after—whilst juggling rehearsals for Arashi's upcoming concerts—he acted as the lead in the drama special , which was based on the true story of an autistic young man training to become a marathon runner.

After a year without any acting roles, other than a small guest appearance in bandmate Satoshi Ohno's first lead drama Maō, Ninomiya finally took up the main role in the drama Ryūsei no Kizuna "流星の絆 with Ryo Nishikido and Erika Toda acting as his younger siblings. The three played the children of parents who were murdered long ago by a nameless man. Readers, reporters and critics of the 59th Television Drama Academy Awards panel recognized his role as the oldest vengeful sibling and awarded him Best Actor. His Ryūsei no Kizuna role also earned him an Outstanding Actor nomination in the drama category in the 49th Monte-Carlo Television Festival.

In spring 2009, Ninomiya starred as the lead in the third and final of the TBS  drama special trilogy Door to Door, with the first and second being Sukoshi wa, Ongaeshi ga Dekitakana and Marathon respectively. The drama special was based on the true story of Bill Porter, an American door-to-door salesman who achieved the highest sales for his company despite suffering from cerebral palsy. His roles in Door to Door and Ryūsei no Kizuna won him the Individual Award in the television category of the 46th Galaxy Awards, a first for a Johnny's talent and the first by an actor in his twenties. Ninomiya began filming for the drama special  in April 2009. However, the special, which saw Ninomiya's first time playing a psychiatrist, did not air on television until September 24, 2009.

In January 2010, Ninomiya co-starred with the other members of Arashi in their first drama in nearly ten years in the human suspense drama special Saigo no Yakusoku "最後の約束”. Ninomiya portrayed , a 27-year-old temporary security center employee who is caught up in a building hijack. On September 20, 2010, he made a guest appearance on the last episode of bandmate Matsumoto and Yūko Takeuchi's getsuku drama .

Ninomiya starred in the drama , his first serial drama since Ryūsei no Kizuna (2008). With Karina as his co-star, Ninomiya portrayed a freeter named . The drama maintained steady viewership ratings throughout its airing, having an average rating of 17.14% overall.

Film 
In 2002, he made his motion picture debut in Arashi's first movie together, . Ninomiya next took to the screen as Shuichi, a high school student trying to get rid of his abusive stepfather, in the 2003 film The Blue Light with Aya Matsuura as his co-star. In 2004, Arashi came together again to reprise their respective roles for the sequel of Pikanchi Life Is Hard Dakedo Happy, .

2006 proved to be a productive year for Ninomiya as he became the first artist from Johnny's & Associates to debut in Hollywood. He played a reluctant soldier called Saigo in Clint Eastwood's Academy Award-winner Letters from Iwo Jima with Academy Award-nominated actor Ken Watanabe. His performance was praised by many film critics, some of which include RogerEbert.com editor Jim Emerson ("thoroughly winning"), Claudia Puig of USA Today ("also superb"), James Berardinelli ("another performer worth singling out") and Kirk Honeycutt of The Hollywood Reporter ("just terrific"). On January 7, 2007, New York Times film critic A. O. Scott listed Ninomiya as an ideal Oscar candidate for Best Supporting Actor. On October 24, 2006, a couple months after returning from filming Letters from Iwo Jima in the United States, he debuted as a voice actor, lending his voice to main character Black in the Michael Arias animated film Tekkon Kinkreet.

In 2007, all the members of Arashi co-starred in their third movie together, with Ninomiya playing the main role of an aspiring manga artist.

On October 1, 2010, the live-action adaptation of Fumi Yoshinaga's award-winning Ōoku: The Inner Chambers manga, which starred Ninomiya and Kou Shibasaki, was released into theaters in Japan. Ninomiya played , a young man living in a matriarchal society due to a disease that killed most of the male population.

Part one of the live-action adaptation of the manga Gantz, which starred Ninomiya and Kenichi Matsuyama, was released on January 20, 2011 in the United States and on January 29, 2011 in Japan. Ninomiya starred as Kei Kurono, a young man who is hit by a subway train and becomes part of a semi-posthumous "game" with other deceased people. Part two of Gantz, titled Gantz: Perfect Answer, hit theaters in Japan on April 23, 2011.

In 2013, Ninomiya played the lead role in the film adaptation of Keigo Higashino's novel Platina Data, []. Ninomiya's 2008 drama series Ryūsei no Kizuna [] was also based on a novel by Higashino.

In the 17th issue of Weekly Shounen Jump magazine, it was revealed that Ninomiya would be the voice of Koro-sensei in the 2015 live-action film adaptation of Assassination Classroom.

On 5 March 2016, Ninomiya won the 39th Japanese Academy Award for Best Actor, for his performance in Living with My Mother (Haha to Kuraseba), succeeding fellow Johnny & Associates colleague Okada Junichi.

The movie Tang, based on the novel "A robot in the garden" by Deborah Install, in which he plays a failed man abandoned by his wife, who finds an amnesiac stray robot in their garden, was released in theaters around Japan on August 11, 2022. A few days later, it was revealed that Ninomiya played also the role of Tang the robot, after he suggested to the producer, who had been testing with both children and adults for creating its movements without results, that he should also play him as a mirror of his own acting. Tang was made by CG animators using motion capture.

Other ventures

Radio 
Ninomiya has his own radio show, Bay Storm, since October 4, 2002. The show is currently airing every Sunday on Japan's BayFM, in which he often plays his own renditions of Arashi's songs as well as songs by other artists.

Magazine
He used to write in MORE magazine a column with the title IT, until it ended in January 2019.

Television variety show host
 Nino san (NTV, April 25, 2013 – present)
 Ninomiyanchi (Special New Year's program substituting Aratsubo, hosted by Arashi, held every January 3, from 2017) (Fuji TV, January 3, 2021)

Telethon
Ninomiya appears as main personality in NTV's 24-Hr TV for 6th time, 5 with Arashi (2004, 2008, 2012, 2013, 2019) (24時間テレビ) and 1 as member of YouTube channel Jyaninochaneru (2022)

YouTuber
A new Johnny's YouTube channel called ジャにのちゃんねる (Jyaninochaneru), lead by Ninomiya himself, was opened in 2021. The channel is also run by KAT-TUN's Yuichi Nakamaru, Hey! Say! JUMP's Ryosuke Yamada, and Sexy Zone's Fuma Kikuchi.

Social Networks
True to his joker nature, Ninomiya opened a Twitter account on March 8, posting only written posts, but in the description, the link he put was that of fellow Johnny Shunsuke Kazama's Johnny's Web profile, causing amusement on his followers. He later shared photos of himself alone and with other Johnny's during the 46th Japan Academy Awards Ceremony.

Commercials 
CM
AC Japan
United Nations World Food Program Assistance Campaign "Biscuits" (Narration) (2007-2008)
Adastria
.ST (Dot ST) Clothing (2021- )
Asahi Group Holdings, Ltd.
Wonda Coffee (2022) With KAT-TUN'S Yuichi Nakamaru
Nihon Eisai Co. Ltd. 
Chocola BB (2010-2012)
Every, Inc. (2017-2018)
Delish Kitchen
Ezaki Glico Co., Ltd.
Pocky (2011-2015)
GungHo Online Entertainment
Puzzles and Dragons (2021- )
Hisamitsu Pharmaceutical
Salonpas (2013- )
House Foods
Shirataki noodle soup with soy milk (2007-2011)
Soup de okoge (2007-2011)
Ito Ham
The GRAND Alt Bayern Sausages (2021- )
Japan Post Holdings
New Year's Day campaign (2007-2008)
J Storm
Hey! Say! JUMP's Ultra Music Power cm (2007)
 Kirin Company, Ltd
 Kirin Beverage Company, Ltd
Shavadava (2008)
JCB
JCB Card (2010- )
Lion Corporation
Top Super NANOX (2016- ); 2021 with fellow Arashi member Masaki Aiba, in a collaborative visual campaign with Soflan
Morinaga & Company
Morinaga Milk Industry pino eskimo (1998-2000)
NEXT (Lifull) Real Estate
HOME'S (2015-2016)
Nintendo Co., Ltd.
Super Mario 3D Land (2011)
Nisshin Oillio Group ja
 Nisshin Oillio (2011- )
Sapporo Breweries
Sapporo Mugi to Hop (2018)

Personal life 
On November 12, 2019, Ninomiya announced his marriage through a handwritten letter he released in their fan club website. He announced the birth of his daughter through his agency on March 5, 2021. The birth of his second daughter was announced on November 19, 2022.

Filmography

Drama

Films

Stage

Discography

Solo album

Awards and nominations

References

External links 

J Storm Profile
Kazunari Ninomiya | Johnny's Net Profile
 
 
 
 Jōnetsu Tairiku (情熱大陸) Documentary Program on Kazunari Ninomiya (originally broadcast on May 6, 2007)
 

1983 births
Living people
Arashi members
Japanese male pop singers
21st-century Japanese male actors
Japanese male film actors
Japanese male stage actors
Japanese male child actors
Japanese male television actors
Japanese male voice actors
Japanese male idols
Singers from Tokyo
20th-century Japanese male singers
20th-century Japanese singers
21st-century Japanese male singers
21st-century Japanese singers